Toco Municipality (also Toko Municipality) is the second municipal section of the Germán Jordán Province in the Cochabamba Department, Bolivia. Its seat is Toco.

The municipality consists of only one canton, Toco Canton (or Toko Canton). It is identical to the municipality.

References 

  Instituto Nacional de Estadistica de Bolivia  (INE)

Municipalities of the Cochabamba Department